The Quebec Esperanto Society is the main association of speakers of the planned language Esperanto in the Canadian province of Quebec. Founded in 1982, its main goals are the advancement of knowledge about Esperanto in Quebec, the promotion of its use, and the organization of Esperanto language courses and activities where Esperanto may be used in a natural social context.

The Quebec Esperanto Society is active in publishing, not only putting out a quarterly newsletter La Riverego for most of the past twenty years, but also in publishing books, most notably an Esperanto translation of Robert Dutil's Nanatasis (2005). The QES hosted the 7th Esperanto Congress of the Americas (TAKE) in Montreal from July 12 to 18, 2008.

External links 

Home page of the Quebec Esperanto Society

Esperanto organizations
Civic and political organizations of Canada
Organizations established in 1982
1982 establishments in Quebec
Organizations based in Quebec
Esperanto in Canada